The Pioche Hills are a mountain range in Lincoln County, Nevada. 
The historic Pioche silver mining district is centered in the Pioche Hills and extends into the adjacent Bristol and Highland Ranges to the west.

References

External links
 USGS Pioche, NV Quad via Topoquest

Mountain ranges of Nevada
Mountain ranges of the Great Basin
Mountain ranges of Lincoln County, Nevada